Dziwneono (subfamily:Typhlocybinae) is a genus of Australian leafhoppers, with more than ten undescribed species. It's been described in 1972 by Polish entomologist Irena Dworakowska.

The genus name is a biological nomenclature curiosity. "Dziwne ono" is Polish for "it is strange".

Distribution
Species of Dziwneono have been found in the Northern Territory and Western Australia states of Australia.

Species
 Dziwneono alfa Dworakowska, 1993
 Dziwneono etcetera Dworakowska, 1972
 Dziwneono olszewskii Dworakowska, 1972
 Dziwneono sagittata Dworakowska, 1993
 Dziwneono septembris Dworakowska, 1972
 Dziwneono weewaa Dworakowska, 1972

References

Further reading 
 
 

Cicadellidae genera
Fauna of Western Australia
Dikraneurini